Nabadwip Municipality is the self-governing and urban local body of the town Nabadwip of Nadia district of the Indian state West Bengal. It is a registered government organisation. The primary and main objective of Nabadwip Municipality is to provide all municipal facilities to all of the citizens.

History 
As per the Town Development Act, 1850, town committees were being founded in various towns. Nadia Town Committee was established in 1 April, 1869 as per the Bengal Municipal Improvement Act, 1864. Election process was started in 1876. At that time, 8 of the 12 members were elected by the tax-payers and rest 4's were nominated. The fist meeting was held in the house of Late Gurudas Das in 1869. Eleven members along with two British men were present at that meeting. They were: 

 Mr. Tuidy  
 Mr. Sabi
 Madhabchandra Vidyaratna
 Prankrishna Bhatta
 Krishnakanta Shirratna
 Ramnath Tarkasiddhanta
 Laxmikanta Bhattacharya
 Prasanna Chandra Tarkaratna
 Shrikrsihna Bandyopadhyay
 Khsetranath Bhattacharya
 Gopalchandra Chattopadhyay

Initially, after the establishment in 1869, the name of the Nadia Town Committee was changed to Nadia Municipal Committee in 1877. Later in 1915, the municipal committee was awarded to municipality status and the name was finally set to Nabadwip Municipality.

List of Chairman and Vice-chairman 

★ ★ No records have been found from 20.05.1905 - 10.09.1920, 08.11.1924 - 26.10.1932 and 16.06.1934 - 17.09.1939. It is found at page no. 47 of the Centenary Memorial Magazine of Nabadwip Hindu School that, Sadanada Bhattacharya was the chairman of Nabadwip Municipality from 1927 to 1932. The chairman of Nabadwip Municipality was Narayan Chandra Banerjee from 1919.

The election was to held in April or May, 2020 and the previous chairman and vice-chairman was to be valid till then. But due to COVID-19 pandemic and lockdown, this process is paused and the current administrator is working.

Departments

References 

Municipalities of West Bengal